Dry Creek is a tributary of Martins Creek in Susquehanna County, Pennsylvania, in the United States. The creek is not designated as an impaired waterbody and is a Coldwater Fishery and a Migratory Fishery. The surficial geology in its vicinity consists of Wisconsinan Till, a lake, and some alluvium in the lower reaches.

Course
Dry Creek begins in an unnamed pond in Brooklyn Township. It flows south for several tenths of a mile and enters Jones Lake, where it receives two unnamed tributaries from the right. From the southern end of Jones Lake, the creek flows south-southeast for a few miles, receiving two unnamed tributaries from the left and two from the right and entering a valley. It then turns south and its valley narrows. After several tenths of a mile, the creek turns south-southwest for a few tenths of a mile, entering Lathrop Township. Shortly after entering Lathrop Township, the creek reaches its confluence with Martins Creek.

Hydrology
Dry Creek is not designated as an impaired waterbody. The creek only seasonally flows into Martins Creek.

Geography and geology

The surficial geology in the valley of Dry Creek consists mostly of a till known as Wisconsinan Till, although large patches of alluvium also occur. Additionally, there is a small patch of peat bog. In the upper reaches, the surficial geology alongside the creek consists entirely of Wisconsinan Till, except for Jones Lake.

Watershed and biology
The mouth of the creek is in the United States Geological Survey quadrangle of Hop Bottom. However, its source is in the quadrangle of Montrose East. The mouth of the creek is located within  of Hop Bottom.

The designated use for Dry Creek is aquatic life. Williams Field Services Company, LLC has received an Erosion and Sediment Control permit for which the receiving streams are the creek and its unnamed tributaries.

Dry Creek is classified as a Coldwater Fishery and a Migratory Fishery.

History
Dry Creek was entered into the Geographic Names Information System on August 2, 1979. Its identifier in the Geographic Names Information System is 1173498.

See also
Hop Bottom Creek, next tributary of Martins Creek going downstream
East Branch Martins Creek, next tributary of Martins Creek going upstream
List of rivers of Pennsylvania

References

Rivers of Susquehanna County, Pennsylvania
Tributaries of Tunkhannock Creek
Rivers of Pennsylvania